The 214th Attack Squadron (214 ATKS) is a unit of the Arizona Air National Guard's 214th Attack Group located at Davis-Monthan Air Force Base, Tucson, Arizona and is operationally-gained by the Air Combat Command (ACC). The 214th is equipped with the General Atomics MQ-9 Reaper.

Operations
Currently, the unit flies over Afghanistan on a continual basis flying 20 hours per day, seven days per week. Predator operations provide troops on the ground with both daylight and infrared video of selected targets. In addition, the aircraft is equipped with two laser-guided AGM-114 Hellfire missiles.

Arizona Air National Guard Predator operations will first fill worldwide theater requirements, but will also likely evolve into providing direct defense for the homeland in conjunction with the Department of Homeland Security and U.S. Northern Command.

A permanent facility located at Davis-Monthan Air Force Base was completed 2009.

Specifics
 Lineage: Designated 214th Reconnaissance Squadron, and allotted to Arizona ANG, 2007
 Extended federal recognition and activated, 29 August 2007
 Assignment: 214th Attack Group,
 Station: Davis-Monthan Air Force Base, Arizona

References

External links
https://web.archive.org/web/20080518204116/http://www.dm.af.mil/news/story.asp?id=123069605

214
Squadrons of the United States Air National Guard
Military units and formations in Arizona